Georgios Gennimatas (30 June 1939, Athens – 25 April 1994, Athens) was a Greek politician and founding member of the Panhellenic Socialist Movement (PASOK). He studied civil engineering at the National Technical University of Athens. He occupied several cabinet posts in the PASOK governments under Andreas Papandreou, serving as Minister of Interior (1981–1984), Welfare and Social Insurance (1984–1987), Labour (1987–1989) and National Economy (1989, 1993–1994). He is most notable for his official recognition of the left-wing fighters of the Greek Resistance during World War II and his healthcare and welfare reforms which established the National Health System (Εθνικό Σύστημα Υγείας) of Greece. His daughter Fofi Gennimata was also a PASOK politician.

Sources

1939 births
1994 deaths
Politicians from Athens
PASOK politicians
National Technical University of Athens alumni
Finance ministers of Greece
Ministers of the Interior of Greece
Health ministers of Greece